Survivor South Africa: Island of Secrets is the seventh season of the South African reality competition show, Survivor South Africa. This season was announced during the season finale of the previous season, Survivor South Africa: Philippines, on 18 August 2018, and applications to compete were accepted until 30 September 2018. The season was filmed in Samoa over 39 days from January to March 2019, and began airing on M-Net on 16 May 2019. The season concluded with a live finale and reunion on September 12, 2019, when Robert "Rob" Bentele was crowned Sole Survivor over Nicole Capper and Durão Mariano by a vote of 6-4-0 respectively. It was the fifth season hosted by Nico Panagio, and was produced by Afrokaans Film & Television.

This season features the titular Island of Secrets, a secluded island where castaways were exiled for short periods. Exiled castaways were given decisions that would net them potential advantages or disadvantages during their time spent away from their tribes, similarly to Ghost Island from the 36th American season, Survivor: Ghost Island. With 21 players (11 men and 10 women), this is the third Survivor South Africa season to feature a gender imbalance, following Santa Carolina and Maldives.

Contestants

The 21 contestants were initially divided into three tribes — Laumei, Sa'ula, and Ta'alo — with seven castaways each. On Day 8, with 18 players remaining, the players were redistributed into three tribes of six by random draw, with a previously exiled castaway earning the right to choose their new tribe. On Day 15, with 15 players remaining, the players were redistributed into two tribes of seven, with the leftover castaway being exiled to the Island of Secrets until the next Tribal Council, where they joined the attending tribe. On Day 20, the 13 remaining players formed the Manumalo tribe, named after the Samoan word for "win".

Notes

Future appearances
Danté de Villiers, Felix Godlo, Meryl Szolkiewicz, Steffi Brink and Tania Copeland competed again in Survivor South Africa: Return of the Outcasts in 2022.

Season summary

The game began with three tribes of seven: Laumei, Sa’ula, and Ta’alo. Sa’ula lost the first two immunity challenges, but an alliance called the Amigos formed between Nathan, Nicole, Rob and Steffi, while fractures in both Laumei and Ta'alo began to form. After a strategic blunder by Jacques at Ta'alo's first Tribal Council, a tribe shuffle on Day 8 saw a new Laumei tribe struggle as Jacques formed a Band of Misfits alliance with original Laumei member Durão and fifth Amigo Seipei. A second tribe shuffle on Day 15 led to the formation of a majority alliance called the Spit-Shakers, seven castaways consisting of a blend of all three original tribes that outnumbered the third Sa'ula tribe.

The last Tribal Council before the merge saw Nicole betraying Nathan due to a recurring injury he sustained at the beginning of the game, but she managed to reunite with the Amigos and side with the Spit-Shakers to systematically eliminate the newer Sa'ula outsiders. The Amigos' plans changed when Seipei suggested to Rob about turning against Nicole and Steffi at the Final 8 with her Band of Misfits. Using a new bond he made with Durão, Rob united the Amigos and remaining Laumei players to take down the remaining loyal Spit-Shakers. Jacques managed to outwit the Amigos' haphazard plans with his hidden immunity idol, but he eventually fell victim to a scornful isolation led by the Amigos until he had no option other than to play his idol; he was sent to the jury shortly after.

The Final Six saw the Amigos with Laetitia, an original Laumei who was dismissed for her age in the beginning of the game, temporarily align to try and get rid of the two remaining Laumei men (Durão and Mike), before they could blindside Rob. However, the three women started to take on the earlier attempts of a women's alliance to take Rob down instead. Rob's back-to-back immunity wins saw an end to the women's plans, with Nicole running to Rob to make a scapegoat out of Steffi and break up the Amigos. With Nicole's true colours revealed, Laetitia tried to fight for a spot in the Final Three, but to no avail. The Final Tribal Council saw the jury berate Rob and Nicole for their malicious methods in executing an almost flawless game, and dismissed Durão as a tool for Rob's strategic game. In the end, the jury respected Rob's active strategic dominance leading the Amigos and the merge over Nicole's cutthroat betrayals and unwavering loyalty to Rob, and awarded him the victory and title of Sole Surivor.

In the case of multiple tribes or castaways who win reward or immunity, they are listed in order of finish, or alphabetically where it was a team effort; where one castaway won and invited others, the invitees are in brackets.
Notes

Episodes

Voting history

References

External links

2019 South African television seasons
Survivor South Africa seasons
Television shows filmed in Samoa